William Carlyle (died 1329) was a Scottish noble. He was the son of William Carlyle and Sapientia.

After his father died in 1274, he inherited lands in Carleil, Cumquintin, Kynmount, Crunyanton, & Petenain in Scotland and Kirk Bampton, Uchtridby, Ormsby, Wortwell, Redenhall, Malton, Appelgarth, & Bayton in England.

Marriage and issue
William married Margaret, daughter of Robert de Brus, jure uxoris Earl of Carrick, and Marjorie, Countess of Carrick, they are known to have had the following issue:
John Carlyle
William Carlyle
Thomas Carlyle
James Carlyle

Notes

References

Balfour Paul, James. The Scots Peerage, 1904, Vol. III, p. 379.
Richardson, Douglas. Magna Carta Ancestry, 2nd Edition, Vol. III, p. 528.

Year of birth unknown
1329 deaths
13th-century Scottish people
14th-century Scottish  people